The basketball tournaments of NCAA Season 85 refers to the basketball events of the Philippine National Collegiate Athletic Association (NCAA)'s 2009–10 season. This is the first season without the PCU Dolphins who have taken an indefinite leave of absence after several of their juniors' division players were found to have used falsified documents to enter the school. Also, three guest teams will take part in the basketball events with all three eligible to win championships.

The games began on June 27 at the Araneta Coliseum with an opening ceremony led by San Beda, with a keynote speech by United States Ambassador to the Philippines Kristie Kenney, culminating with a tripleheader with season host San Beda Red Lions routing the Mapua Cardinals 82–55 in the opening game. The four-time juniors champion San Sebastian Staglets will also begin their title defense, with a majority of the games being held at the Filoil Flying V Arena in San Juan.

In the seniors' division, the San Sebastian Stags had an all-time league-best 15-game winning streak, ending on their second-round game against the Letran Knights. The Stags ended the elimination round tied with the San Beda Red Lions for first, who beat them in the elimination round finale. The Red Lions defeated the Stags in the playoff for the #1 seed, and they were beaten anew by the third seed JRU Heavy Bombers in the first game of the semifinals. The Stags beat the Heavy Bombers in Game 2 to meet the Red Lions in the Finals who had previously beaten the Knights in their own semifinals. Game 1 of the Finals went into two overtimes, with the Stags eking out a 4-point triumph. The Red Lions, who led for majority of the game, faltered in the fourth quarter of Game 2 to allow the Stags to clinch their first title since 2002. Jimbo Aquino of San Sebastian was named Finals Most Valuable Player (MVP) in his final playing year.

In the juniors' division, the Letran Squires had a 17-game winning streak, only for them to be beaten by the San Beda Red Cubs in the last game of the elimination round. The Red Cubs blew out the Squires in the playoff for #1, but both teams did not need their twice-to-beat advantage to eliminate the JRU Light Bombers and the San Sebastian Staglets respectively in the semifinals. In Game 1 of the Finals, San Beda blew out Letran for the second game in a row, but the Squires outlasted the Red Cubs in Game 2 via a late three-pointer to force Game 3. In the deciding game, San Beda pulled away late in the fourth quarter after Letran cut down the 15-point lead to two points to give retiring coach Ato Badolato his 15th juniors' championship. The Squires suffered their third consecutive Finals defeat; they previously lost twice to the Staglets prior losing to the Red Cubs. Baser Amer was awarded the Finals MVP award.

JRU players John Wilson and Louie Vigil were awarded Most Valuable Player honors for the seniors' and juniors' divisions respectively. American Sudan Daniels and Baser Amer both from San Beda were named seniors' and juniors' Rookies of the Year.

Seniors' tournament

Teams

Preseason
The league announced that the games will be held at the Filoil Flying V Arena for most games and the Araneta Coliseum for bigger games, while the other sports will be held at the Rizal Memorial Sports Complex and the PhilSports Complex via a partnership with the Philippine Sports Commission. The NCAA originally wanted to play in the Rizal Memorial Coliseum "But it's still under repair so maybe next year," management committee chairman Jose Mari Lacson of San Beda College said.

Former UST Growling Tigers head coach Aric del Rosario was appointed as the league commissioner who immediately warning players not to commit dangerous fouls, and the more strict enforcement of the handcheck foul. Another new rule is that there would now be two people on the bench allowed to stand up instead of only one previously; del Rosario said that the head coach and his head assistant are now allowed to stand up. If a third person is caught standing up, a warning will be issued, and on the second violation, a technical foul will be charged on the team.

Furthermore, a new system of filing game protests concerning results, eligibility of players and the like will be used:
No more complaints will be heard against a team that has already won the championship.
A team must file a protest within 48 hours to contest the result of a match along with a bond of P5,000 which must be submitted to the management committee of the league.
On eligibility complaints, a team must submit its written complaint the day after the first round of eliminations. The complaint will require a bond of P10,000.

Prior to Arellano's admission as a guest team, Isaac was head coach for both Mapua and Arellano since NCAA and NCRAA seasons are held at different times of the year.

Elimination round

Team standings

Match-up results

Scores

First round

June–July

With a total of ten teams this season, the traditional quadruple–header at the Araneta Coliseum would not be held but instead the opening Saturday would consist of three games: in the traditional champion vs. host opening game, season host and defending champion San Beda blew out the 2008 hosts Mapua 85–52, JRU overcame a late surge by Letran by winning 69–66, and San Sebastian defeated UPHSD in the nightcap, 76–64.

With the Filoil Flying V Arena in San Juan hosting the rest of the elimination round in the second day, CSB overcame AUF's late surge, and Arellano blew out fellow hosts EAC. In a day of upsets, San Sebastian gave San Beda its worst start in their last four seasons, while guests Arellano defeated Letran anew, placing the Knights at the bottom of the standings. JRU and Benilde remained unbeaten, winning against UPHSD and Mapua respectively to join Arellano and San Sebastian at the top of the standings with a 2–0 slate at the end of the first week of competition.

San Beda dealt Arellano their first loss at the start of week 2, with the Great Danes winning their first game against fellow guest school EAC. In a battle of winless teams, Letran rallied from behind, but this time won against UPHSD, and in the battle of undefeated teams, San Sebastian pulled away at the second half to beat CSB. In Friday's blowout games, Mapua notched their first win against AUF, and JRU kept up with San Sebastian with a trashing of EAC.

In week three, San Beda blew out their opponents: a 20–point drubbing of Benilde, and a 33–point massacre of UPHSD. JRU and San Sebastian continued their unbeaten runs with double–digit wins over guest teams Arellano and EAC respectively. The other guest team, AUF, also suffered a double–digit loss against UPHSD, while Letran won the Battle of Intramuros emphatically with a 22–point blowout against Mapua.

San Sebastian and JRU continued their unbeaten runs; the Stags defeated the Chiefs, and the Heavy Bombers blowing out the Great Danes. The Generals clinched their first win in the league with a victory over Mapua, while the Blazers escaped with a one–point win over the Altas. Prior to the CSB-UPHSD game, San Beda and Letran faced off with the Red Lions winning by five points, but that is before Letran's Kris Alas pushed Sudan Daniel, that started a free-for-all; Letran's Jaypee Belencion confronted fans at the stands, and Kevin's father Louie Alas, Letran's head coach, had to shield his wife from debris being pelted on the court.

In the end, Kris Alas and Belencion were suspended, the former by one game and the latter by three games, while Louie Alas, his brother and assistant coach of Letran Mel, his son Keven, and Daniels were given stern warnings by the Management Committee (MANCOM).

The CSB vs. EAC game would devolve into another physical game with several Blazers figuring in a bench-clearing incident; despite CSB's Jeff Morial having 32 points, the Generals notched another win, marking their first winning streak in the NCAA. Meanwhile, San Sebastian extended their winning streak to six with another blowout win, this time against AUF, but not before AUF's Chuck Gomez threw a punch to the opponent. As a result, the MANCOM suspended CSB's Chuck Dalanon and Jan Tan, and Gomez for one game.

JRU matched San Sebastian with a win against Mapua, while Letran rebounded with a win against AUF. In a game that needed three overtimes to finish, CSB thwarted off Arellano by ten points, after Morial sank in 31 points, and hitting crucial three–pointers. Morial converted two three-pointers in the end of regulation to force the first overtime, then another to extend the game into the third overtime, and the last putting away the Chiefs for good. Despite scoring 29 points, mostly in the first half, AU's Gio Ciriacruz fouled out late in the fourth quarter, which started disqualifications of five other Chiefs. Meanwhile, San Beda held off EAC to keep pace with the Stags and the Heavy Bombers at the top.

August
In a meeting of the two 6–0 teams, the Stags won emphatically over JRU, although the Bombers rebounded with a win over CSB later in the week. Perpetual Help won against Mapua, but before losing to the Chiefs, while San Beda and Letran held off separate opponents, with the Knights needing an extra period to ward off the Generals.

San Beda and JRU ended their first round with a rematch of last year's Finals series in which the Red Lions won. Although both teams sported 7–1 cards, the Heavy Bombers faltered for the second consecutive big game anew, losing the Red Lions to close out their first round campaign on a losing note. Meanwhile, San Sebastian was taken by Mapua to the limit before losing by three points, to set up an anticipated game against arch rival Letran at the first round finale. The Cardinals themselves ended the first round on a 6-game losing streak, after falling to the Arellano Chiefs who closed out with their own 4-game winning streak; prior to their Mapua win, the Chiefs also won against cellar-dweller AUF. Perpetual Help gave EAC their second 4-game losing streak with an 86–79 win.

In the first round finale, Letran led for majority of the game, even by as much as ten at halftime, before the Stags staged a third quarter rally to lead by double digits. The Knights clawed through, and had a chance to extend the game into overtime, but Kevin Alas' off-balanced three-pointer rattled in and out of the rim as time expired to give San Sebastian their first first round sweep since their 1997 championship run.

Second round

August
San Sebastian extended their winning streak to 10 with a rather unexpected 12-point win against AUF; as JRU rebounded with a win against Perpetual Help. Letran and Arellano both won their respective first second-round games against EAC and CSB respectively, while San Beda outlasted Mapua to extend their own winning streak to eight, and lengthen Mapua's losing streak to seven. San Sebastian added to UPHSD's woes as they gave the Altas a 0–2 second round record.

Letran and Arellano remained locked at fourth with wins against Mapua and AUF; Letran's win over Mapua was their first second round win in eight seasons against their Intramuros neighbors. San Beda and JRU also had easy wins against EAC and CSB to remain undefeated in the second round. Emilio Aguinaldo College would notch their first win the second round with a thriller over Perpetual Help, and RJ Jazul saved the Knights from a 0–2 season sweep against Arellano with a clutch three–pointer to break Letran and Arellano's tie at fourth place.

San Beda and JRU still maintained the second and third places in the team standings with easy wins against doormats Angeles University Foundation and Mapua; both losing schools were eliminated from semifinals contention.

September
The trend of the top four teams beating the bottom six continued with San Sebastian and Letran winning over their opponents, with both teams settling for blowout wins against EAC and CSB respectively, and San Sebastian clinching the first semifinal ticket. San Beda and JRU ended the week how it started, with easy wins against Perpetual Help and Arellano respectively, giving the two teams tickets to the semifinals.

AUF surprisingly hung tough against Letran in the first three quarters but the Knights pulled away at the fourth quarter to cement their hold at fourth-place. Meanwhile, San Sebastian extend their winning streak to thirteen games with another blowout win against Mapua. EAC denied CSB of a win against the guest team, denying the Blazers for the seventh consecutive year a Final Four berth. Meanwhile, San Beda gave Arellano's Final Four hopes in peril with a 9-point win. In the Friday games, Mapua broke their 10-game losing streak with a spirited win against Perpetual Help, and JRU's defense held up against Letran for a blowout win against the Knights to score a 5–0 second round record. Letran's loss meant that they won't be able to clinch the twice-to-beat advantage in the semifinals, leaving San Sebastian, San Beda and JRU the only teams in contention for the coveted advantage.

San Sebastian tied the record set by the San Beda Red Lions in the 2006 season, with 14 consecutive wins with a win against St. Benilde. EAC avenged their first round loss against AUF with a double-digit win, with Letran had another fourth quarter run to pull away against UPHSD in the endgame. The Heavy Bombers finally caught up with the Red Lions, fashioning out a 13-point win thanks to Mark Cagoco's three-point shooting. The win tied the two teams for second place. In the week's last pair of games, Mapua hands Letran the last semifinal berth with a double-digit upset against the Chiefs, while CSB ends their 6-game losing streak with an easy win against AUF.

Mapua continued their end-of-season run, this time outlasting EAC to clinch their third consecutive win, as San Sebastian broke the record for most consecutive wins with a dismantling of the Chiefs, bringing their total wins to 15. JRU and San Beda remained tied for #2 with contrasting wins against AUF and CSB; JRU had to grind it out with AUF which is in a 14-game losing streak, while San Beda had an easier time as a depleted CSB ran out of gas in the fourth quarter. Arellano won to clinch fifth place and the 2009 Philippine Collegiate Championship wildcard entry that goes along with it, against UPHSD.

In the San Sebastian-Letran rivalry game, the Knights employed the full-court press in the opening moments that made the game a low-scoring affair; several technical and unsportsmanlike fouls were called, and the Knights pulled away in the second quarter. The Stags had a rally in the third quarter to bring the lead down to single-digits, but shooting from Smart Gilas mainstays RJ Jazul and Rey Guevarra padded Letran's lead to an insurmountable 15–point lead that gave San Sebastian their first loss in the season.

October
Tropical Storm Ketsana (local name: Ondoy) struck Metro Manila on September 26 causing massive flooding in Eastern Metro Manila and western Rizal. Due to the flooding, eight seniors' and juniors' games were rescheduled. With the resumption of games on October 2 a week after the tropical storm hit, games resumed but not after a moment of silence was observed commemorating all victims of the typhoon, including Philippine Basketball Association team Barako Bull Energy Boosters manager and former Letran Squires football player Tony Chua, who died in the height of the storm. San Beda had an easy win against Letran, but not before Letran's Rey Guevarra was injured after he hit San Beda's Sudan Daniel. Guevarra would be ruled out for the rest of the season with an anterior cruciate ligament (ACL) injury. AUF continued with their second round slump, losing to Mapua which has now won four consecutive games.

Perpetual Help continued winless in the second round, this time losing to the Great Danes, which notched their second win after losing 15 consecutive times; EAC beat Arellano to split their elimination round series against each other, with AU ending the elimination round at fifth place. UPHSD ended the second round winless, losing to CSB, which later in the week lost their last game against Mapua. CSB had more wins than their brother school De La Salle Green Archers in the UAAP, although both Lasallian schools were eliminated in their respective leagues. Meanwhile, San Sebastian clinched the twice-to-beat advantage in the semifinals with a win over JRU, which won their last game of the season against EAC with a 36-point rout to end their elimination round campaign with a win; the Generals ended tied for sixth and presumably holds the tiebreakers against Mapua and CSB and can clinch the NCAA's last zonal berth in the 2009 Philippine Collegiate Championship.

In the elimination round finale, San Sebastian was beaten by San Beda in a thrilling finish; with the score tied, a tightly guarded Jimbo Aquino turned over the ball, leading to a wide-open fastbreak lay-up by Bambam Gamalinda to forge a playoff for #1 between the two teams.

First–seed playoff

Bracket

Overtime

Semifinals
San Beda and San Sebastian have the twice-to-beat advantage. They only have to win once, while their opponents, twice, to progress.

San Beda vs. Letran

San Sebastian vs. JRU

Finals

Finals Most Valuable Player:

Awardees
Most Valuable Player: 
Rookie of the Year: 
Mythical Five:
 

 

Defensive Player of the Year: 
Most Improved Player:  
Players of the Week:

Controversies

Non-coverage controversy
Previously, only the Wednesday and Friday pre-Final Four games, including the opening ceremonies were aired on Studio 23. But beginning this season, all NCAA games are seen live on Monday, Wednesday and Friday, with an HD simulcast on Balls. However, on July 27, 2009, ABS-CBN, through UHF channel Studio 23 did not air the scheduled NCAA games to give way for the State of the Nation Address of President Gloria Macapagal Arroyo. Likewise, on August 5, 2009, the scheduled NCAA games were not aired live to give way to former President Corazon Aquino's funeral. The snub disappointed the NCAA fans and even the school representatives. This was in stark contrast to Studio 23's coverage of the UAAP games, where all of its games are aired. As a result, they are now in the process of exploring different options in considering a new broadcast partner.

Juniors' tournament
Games will begin on June 28 at the San Juan Gym, while all remaining elimination round games will be held at the Filoil Flying V Arena in San Juan, with two rescheduled games held at the Ynares Sports Arena in Pasig.

Elimination round
JRU Light Bomber Joshua Saret broke the record established for fellow Light Bomber Keith Agovida last year by scoring 89 points in a 171–43 rout of the AUF Baby Danes.

Team standings

Schedule

Results

Fourth–seed playoff

First–seed playoff

Bracket

Semifinals

Finals

Finals Most Valuable Player:

Awardees

Most Valuable Player: 
Rookie of the Year: 
Mythical Five:

Defensive Player of the Year: 
Most Improved Player:

Broadcast notes
Studio 23 carried all games live. SkyCable Channel 166 (Balls HD) aired the finals series on high definition live, with Balls SD airing the replays. The Filipino Channel broadcast the games outside the Philippines.

See also
UAAP Season 72 basketball tournaments

References

External links
NCAA official website
UBelt.com
NCAA basketball at Inboundpass.com

84
2009–10 in Philippine college basketball